Julia Pietrucha (born 17 March 1989 in Warsaw) is a Polish actress, singer, and model. In 2007, she won the Special Acting Award at the Gdynia Film Festival for her performance in Jutro idziemy do kina. In 2009, she played Halinka in Tatarak, a film directed by Andrzej Wajda.

Pietrucha appeared in regular roles in the television series Kochaj mnie, kochaj! and Blondynka. In 2014, she won the first episode of the Polish talent show Twoja twarz brzmi znajomo. In April 2016, she released her first album, .

Credits

Television

Films

References

External links
 
 Julia Pietrucha at filmpolski.pl

1989 births
Living people
Actresses from Warsaw
Polish film actresses
Polish television actresses
21st-century Polish singers
21st-century Polish women singers